National Lampoon's Animal House is a 1978 comedy film.

Animal House may also refer to:

Music
 Animal House (Angie Martinez album), with the song of the same name
 Animal House (U.D.O. album)
 "Animal House", a song from the 1984 album Walkin' the Razor's Edge by Helix

Television
 "Animal House", an episode of the BBC's Natural World
 "The Animal House", the same episode as part of the PBS series Nature

See also
 The Real Animal House: The Awesomely Depraved Saga of the Fraternity That Inspired the Movie, a memoir by Chris Miller
 Delta House, a TV series based on the 1978 film